Frank Cassara (March 22, 1928 - January 11, 2017) was an American football fullback who played for the San Francisco 49ers. He played college football at Saint Mary's College of California, having previously attended San Fernando High School in Pacoima, Los Angeles. He was a member of the Athletic Hall of Fame at Saint Mary's.

References

1928 births
2017 deaths
American football fullbacks
Saint Mary's Gaels football players
San Francisco 49ers players
Sportspeople from Los Angeles County, California
Players of American football from California
People from San Fernando, California